Kargılı is a village in Tarsus district of Mersin Province, Turkey. The population of Kargılı was 816  as of 2012. The new airpost of the region, namely Çukurova Airport is planned to be constructed between Çiçekli and Kargılı .

References

Villages in Tarsus District